Fabrice Millischer (born 15 January 1985 in Toulouse) is a French trombonist, sackbutist and cellist.

He is the recipient of the 1st Prize of the ARD International Music Competition Munich, of the Victoires de la musique classique in 2011 in the category Révélation soliste instrumental de l'année ("Instrumental Solo Revelation of the Year") and had the honor of receiving a "EchoKlassik Preis" in 2014 for his CD French Trombone Concertos

Biography 
Fabrice Millischer was awarded the 1st prizes of cello and trombone at the Toulouse conservatory.

He studied cello at the Conservatoire de Paris with Philippe Muller, Roland Pidoux and Xavier Phillips.

He studied the trombone in the Lyon conservatory with Michel Becquet and Alain Manfrin, and the sackbut with Daniel Lassalle. He played with Jordi Savall and the sackbutists. He performs in recitals at international festivals (Washington, Beijing, Munich, Basel, Paris, Tokyo).

He taught at the Paul Dukas conservatory in Paris before teaching in 2009 at the Hochschule für Musik Saar then in 2013 at the Hochschule für Musik Freiburg.

Between 2009 and 2013, he was trombonist in the philharmonic orchestra of Radio Saarbrücken Kaiserslautern.

References

External links 
 Fabrice Millischer Trombone ténor on Quartbone
 Fabrice Millischer on Trombone France
 Official website
 Fabrice Millischer on Sartory artists
 Fabrice Millischer on AparteMusic
 Fabrice millischer - Chant du ménestrel - A. Glazounov on YouTube

1985 births
Living people
Musicians from Toulouse
French classical trombonists
Male trombonists
French classical cellists
Sackbut players
Conservatoire de Paris alumni
French music educators
French performers of early music
21st-century classical trombonists
21st-century French male musicians
21st-century cellists